Cypripedium is a genus of 58 species and nothospecies of hardy orchids; it is one of five genera that together compose the subfamily of lady's slipper orchids (Cypripedioideae). They are widespread across much of the Northern Hemisphere, including most of Europe and Africa (Algeria) (one species), Russia, China, Central Asia, Canada the United States, Mexico, and Central America. They are most commonly known as slipper orchids, lady's slipper orchids, or ladyslippers; other common names include moccasin flower, camel's foot, squirrel foot, steeple cap, Venus' shoes, and whippoorwill shoe. An abbreviation used in trade journals is "Cyp."

Most of Cypripedium grow in temperate and subtropical climates, but some species grow in the tundra in Alaska and Siberia, which is an unusually cold habitat for orchids.  Other species occur well into tropical areas such as Honduras and Myanmar.

Some of the northern species can withstand extreme cold, growing under the snow and blooming when the snow melts. But, in the wild, some have become rare and close to extinction, due to an ever shrinking natural habitat and over-collection, people prizing the flowers for their beauty. Several species are legally protected in some regions. In the late 20th century, only a single known plant of Cypripedium calceolus survived in Britain.

Characteristics 
The Cypripedium are terrestrial and, as with most terrestrial orchids, the rhizome is short and robust, growing in the uppermost soil layer. The rhizome grows annually with a growth bud at one end and dies off at the other end. The stem grows from the bud at the tip of the rhizome. Most slipper orchids have an elongate erect stem, with leaves growing along its length. But the mocassin flower or pink lady's slipper (Cypripedium acaule) has a short underground stem with leaves springing from the soil. The often hairy leaves can vary from ovate to elliptic or lanceolate, folded (plicate) along their length. The stems lack pseudobulbs.

The inflorescence is racemose. It can carry one to twelve flowers, as in Cypripedium californicum. But most species have one to three flowers. There are three sepals, with, in most species, the two lateral ones more or less fused. The flower has three acute petals with the third a striking slipper-shaped lip, which is lowermost. The sepals and the petals are usually similarly colored, with the lip in a different color. But variations on this theme occur. The aspect of the lip of different species can vary a great deal. As with all orchids, it is specially constructed to attract pollinators, which it traps temporarily. The flowers show a column with a unique shield-like staminode.  The ovary is 3-locular (with three chambers).

Taxonomy 
Comparison between a DNA-analysis and the morphological characteristics in this genus has shown that there is a high degree of divergence between the two, probably due to long periods of isolation or extinction of intermediate forms. The Eurasian species with yellow or red flowers form a distinct group from the North American species with yellow flowers. The Mexican Pelican Orchid (Cypripedium irapeanum) and the California lady's slipper (Cypripedium californicum) are probably the first diverging line. They share several similarities with their sister group Selenipedium.

Species and natural hybrids 
There are 58 currently recognized species and nothospecies (naturally occurring hybrids) recognized in this genus, as of May 2014:

Subgenus Cypripedium

Subgenus Irapeana

Natural Hybrids

Uses
The genus has a long history of use, dating back 2,500 years to the Far East, where they were used medicinally.

Conservation
Several orchid species thought to be extinct in the United Kingdom including one native species in this genus have been found in habitat and are currently the subject of aggressive conservation efforts to protect and restore these showy plants to their native ranges.

Awards
The following have received the Royal Horticultural Society's Award of Garden Merit:-
Cypripedium formosanum
Cypripedium Hank Small gx
Cypripedium Michael gx 
Cypripedium reginae 
Cypripedium Sabine gx

References 
 Phillip Cribb & Peter Green (1997). The Genus Cypripedium (a botanical monograph). Kew Royal Botanic Gardens, Timber Press 
 Pridgeon, A.M.; Cribb, P.J.; Chase, M.W. & F. N. Rasmussen (1999): Genera Orchidacearum Vol.1, page: 114 ff., Oxford U. Press.

External links 
 
 
 Cypripedium - Infos by Mr. Frosch
 Photos of Chinese Slipper Orchids
 Cypripedium japonicum Cypripedium macranthum var. hotei-atsumorianum Images of Japanese Cypripedium
 Cypripedium picture database

 
Orchid genera
Taxa named by Carl Linnaeus